Baily House is a historic home located at Newark in New Castle County, Delaware.  It was built about 1835 and is a -story "L"-shaped frame dwelling with a three-bay front facade. It was probably constructed as a single-family dwelling that may have been formerly connected to a row of matching houses. Some believe that it was moved from Baltimore to Newark in the mid-19th century.  It was the residence of Harriet Baily, who headed the Art Department of the University of Delaware from 1928 until 1956.

It was added to the National Register of Historic Places in 1982.

References

University of Delaware
Houses on the National Register of Historic Places in Delaware
Houses completed in 1835
Houses in Newark, Delaware
National Register of Historic Places in New Castle County, Delaware